XHMEX-FM 104.9/XEMEX-AM 950 is a combo radio station in Ciudad Guzmán, Jalisco, Mexico. It is owned by Grupo Radiorama and carries a grupera format known as La Mexicana.

History
XELW-AM 1510 received its concession on December 3, 1970. It was owned by Francisco Barragan Figueroa and broadcast with 5,000 watts. By the 1980s, it had moved to 950 kHz and taken on the XEMEX calls. XHMEX-FM was authorized in 1994. It was transferred to Emisoras de Zapotlán in 1999.

The 950 AM transmitter is located on the Ciudad Guzmán-Guadalajara highway, while the FM station broadcasts from the studios in central Ciudad Guzmán.

References

Radio stations in Jalisco
Radio stations established in 1954